Sacada fasciata is a species of snout moth. It is found in Korea, Japan, China, Myanmar, India and Russia.

The wingspan is 26–33 mm. The ground colour of the forewings is brownish olive. Adults are on wing from May to September.

The larvae feed on Quercus acutissima, Quercus serrata, Quercus aliena and Lespedeza bicolor.

References

Moths described in 1878
Pyralinae
Moths of Japan